Butare, also known as Huye, is a city with a population of 75,000 (2022 census) in the Southern Province of Rwanda and the capital of Huye district. It is the fifth largest town in Rwanda by population.

History
The Belgian colonial rulers established it in the 1920s and named the city Astrida, in honor of Queen Astrid of Belgium, The government of Rwanda changed the name of the city when it gained independence in 1962.

Education

The University of Rwanda Butare campus was founded in 2013. Before that, the Butare campus went by the name of National University of Rwanda subsequent its foundation in 1963. Due to the large number of university students and student-centered activities in the city, Butare is often regarded as a university city. It also held the Nyakibanda Seminary and the Rwandan National Institute of Scientific Research.

The city of Butare has long been regarded as the intellectual capital of the country, while Kigali holds most political power.

The Groupe Scolaire Officiel de Butare is the largest secondary school in Rwanda.

Culture 
 
The Ethnographic Museum was built in the early 1990s and is a source of information on the cultural history of the country and the region.

Sports
The city has one professional football team competing in the top-flight of Rwanda football – Mukura Victory Sports, currently playing in the Rwanda Premier League and plays its home games at Stade Huye.

Places of worship    
 
Among the places of worship, they are predominantly Christian churches and temples : Roman Catholic Diocese of Butare (Catholic Church), (Lutheran Church of Rwanda (Lutheran World Federation), the Anglican Church of Rwanda (Anglican Communion), Union of Baptist Churches in Rwanda (Baptist World Alliance), Assemblies of God, Church of the Nazarene. There are also Muslim mosques.

Transportation
The city is served by Butare Airport, a small civilian airport, administered by the Rwanda Civil Aviation Authority.

References

 
Southern Province, Rwanda
Populated places in Rwanda